John A. Watson served as a member of the 1862–1863 California State Assembly, representing the 2nd District.

References

Members of the California State Assembly
19th-century American politicians
Year of birth missing
Year of death missing